Cody Martin Linley (born November 20, 1989) is an American actor and singer. He played a recurring role as Jake Ryan in the television series Hannah Montana, and was a contestant on the seventh season of Dancing with the Stars, in which he was partnered with Julianne Hough and finished fourth.

Acting career
Linley made his acting debut in the 1998 made-for-television film Still Holding On: The Legend of Cadillac Jack. Subsequently, he had supporting roles in four films released in 2000: My Dog Skip, Where the Heart Is, Walker, Texas Ranger, and Miss Congeniality. In 2003, Linley was in the independent film When Zachary Beaver Came to Town and appeared in the movie Cheaper by the Dozen. He also played a live-action version of Arnold for a commercial for Hey Arnold!: The Movie.

Other film roles include Hannah Montana, The Haunting Hour: Don't Think About It, Rebound, and his biggest film role, Hoot (2006), with Logan Lerman and Brie Larson.  He also had a role in an episode of That's So Raven as Daryl in the Episode Five Finger Discount the Boy who was friends with Corey Baxter [Kyle Massey] that tricked Corey into stealing a Monkey Key Chain.

Most recently, Linley appeared in ten episodes of Hannah Montana as Jake Ryan. Linley co-hosted the 2008 Disney Channel Games.

Dancing with the Stars
Linley was a contestant on Season 7 of Dancing with the Stars. He was the youngest contestant of that season. He is also the youngest male star to ever compete. He was temporarily paired with Edyta Śliwińska, who had been eliminated earlier in the season with her partner Jeffrey Ross, for Weeks 7 and 8 of the competition. Śliwińska was brought back after Linley's partner on the show, Julianne Hough, was hospitalized. Hough became his partner again in Week 9. Linley, however, was voted off the show on November 18, 2008.

Performance

On May 5, 2009, he returned to the eighth season of Dancing with the Stars. He participated in the new pro dancer competition as Afton DelGrosso's partner/student because the final three pro dancers each had to teach a star from a previous season.

Music career
Linley released his first single "Breathe" featuring Capo in September 2010. His debut album was released in 2012.

Personal life
Linley was born in Lewisville, Texas, the son of Cathryn Sullivan, an acting coach, and Lee Linley.

Linley made YouTube videos, called the Ro and Co Show, with fellow Disney star, Roshon Fegan from Camp Rock. On June 14, 2008, they performed their song "Dis Me" at The Key Club Hollywood.

Linley is a member of the Hollywood Knights celebrity basketball team.

Linley also took acting classes with Demi Lovato, Selena Gomez, and Logan Henderson. 

Linley's brother, Chad Linley, died on August 4, 2011. He was 29 years old. Adult Swim did a tribute bumper to "Chad Linley 1982-2011.

Linley lives with 3 dogs, loves animals and is vegan.

Filmography

References

External links

 
 TheRoandCoShow's Channel (Roshon Fegan and Cody Linley's YouTube)
 Rotten Tomatoes biography

1989 births
20th-century American male actors
21st-century American male actors
21st-century American singers
American male child actors
American male film actors
American male singers
American male television actors
Living people
Male actors from Texas
Participants in American reality television series
People from Lewisville, Texas